Neaz Morshed Nahid is a first-class and List A cricketer from Bangladesh.  A right-arm fast-medium bowler, he is sometimes referred to on scoresheets by his nickname Nahid and played for Dhaka Division in 2004/05.  He took 3 for 23 against Rajshahi Division in one of his two first-class games and 4 for 24 against Khulna Division in a limited overs match.

References 

Bangladeshi cricketers
Dhaka Division cricketers
Chittagong Division cricketers
1983 births
Living people